Fearless is a 1978 poliziottesco film directed by Stelvio Massi.

Cast 
Maurizio Merli: Walter "Wally" Spada
Joan Collins: Brigitte
Gastone Moschin: Karl
Werner Pochath: Strauss
Annarita Grapputo: Annalise von Straben
Alexander Trojan: Von Straben
Jasmine Maimone: Renata
Massimo Vanni: Benito
Luciana Turina: Adele
Franco Ressel: Dr. Zimmer
Andrea Scotti: Inspector Nardelli

Production
According to director Stelvio Massi, the film was inspired by the character of Philip Marlowe, who he tried to have Maurizio Merli imitate to make him "more human, less violent cop, somewhat different from those he had already successfully played." Merli stated that when the producer found out that Merli's character would only shoot his gun once in the film,he was told "Come on, he must be shooting like mad, or else nobody's going to watch this movie!"

Fearless was shot at Incir - De Paolis studios in Rome and on location in Vienna.

Release
Fearless was distributed theatrically in Italy by Fida on February 3, 1978. It grossed a total of 1,146,557,460 Italian lire domestically. It was released in France and Greece on home video as Magnum Cop and in Sweden on home video as Fearless Fuzz, A Matter of Honour.

References

Sources

External links

1978 films
Austrian crime drama films
Poliziotteschi films
Films scored by Stelvio Cipriani
Films shot in Vienna
1970s Italian films
Films directed by Stelvio Massi